The 2023 Adamawa State House of Assembly election will take place on 11 March 2023, to elect members of the Adamawa State House of Assembly. The election will be held concurrent with the state gubernatorial election as well as twenty-seven other gubernatorial elections and elections to all other state houses of assembly. It will be held two weeks after the presidential election and National Assembly elections.

Electoral system
The members of state Houses of Assembly are elected using first-past-the-post voting in single-member constituencies.

Background
In the previous House of Assembly elections, the PDP gained a slight majority that elected Aminu Iya Abbas (PDP-Uba/Gaya) as Speaker. In other Adamawa elections, incumbent Governor Bindow Jibrilla (APC) was unseated by Ahmadu Umaru Fintiri (PDP) in the gubernatorial election; legislatively the PDP also gained ground, winning two Senate seats and five House of Representatives seats while the PDP presidential nominee, Adamawa-native Atiku Abubakar, won the state back from Buhari.

Key events included the attempted removal of MHA Joseph Ayuba Kwada (Michika) for defecting from the PDP to the APC despite two members—Shuaibu Musa (Mubi North) and Musa Umar Bororo (Mubi South)—having previously defected from the APC to PDP without repercussion along with a controversial bill that created 22 new districts.

Overview

Summary

Notes

See also 
 2023 Nigerian elections
 2023 Nigerian House of Assembly elections

References 

House of Assembly
2023
Adamawa